Else of Erlenhof (German: Else von Erlenhof ) is a 1919 Austrian silent drama film directed by and starring Fritz Kortner.

Cast
 Poldi Müller
 Fritz Kortner
 Rudolf Danegger

References

Bibliography
 Bock, Hans-Michael & Bergfelder, Tim. The Concise CineGraph. Encyclopedia of German Cinema. Berghahn Books, 2009.

External links

1919 films
Austrian silent feature films
Films directed by Fritz Kortner
Austrian drama films
1919 drama films
Austrian black-and-white films
Silent drama films
1910s German-language films